The 1992 Manitoba municipal elections were held on October 28, 1992 to elect mayors, councillors and school trustees in various communities throughout Manitoba, Canada.

Cities

Brandon

Winnipeg

See: 1992 Winnipeg municipal election

Rural Municipalities

Rockwood

Villages

Waskada

Source: Winnipeg Free Press newspaper, 29 October 1992.

Vaughn Ramsay
Ramsay is a farmer.  He was a candidate for the Liberal Party of Canada in the 1979 federal election, and finished third in the Brandon—Souris riding.  He was Liberal candidate for 
Arthur-Virden in the 2003 provincial elections. He served as Mayor of Waskada, a village in southwestern Manitoba of fewer than 300 people, from 1992 to 2006.  In 1998, he expressed concern that a proposal to close the local school could result in the destruction of his community.  The school remained open, although the closure of N.M. Paterson & Sons grain elevator the following year was a setback for the local economy.  He did not run for re-election in 2006.

School Divisions

Stan Franklin chaired the Manitoba Health Department's mental health program for northern Manitoba.  He became Chair of the Mystery Lake Division in 1997, after Bev Desjarlais was elected to the House of Commons.
Fred MacLean was not a member of the previous board.
Gary McMillan was elected to the Mystery Lake School Board in 1992, and was its chair before Bev Desjarlais was selected for the position in 1994.  In February 1994, he announced that two area teachers had been suspended for fighting in front of their students.
Margaret Pronyk operates a bookkeeping organization in Northern Manitoba.  She has served as president of BPW Canada, has lobbied in favour of progressive pay equity policies, and was named BPW Canada Woman of the Year in 2004.  She was also the Chief Electoral Officer for the northern provincial constituency of Thompson in 1999.  She indicated that she required icebreakers to transport ballot boxes, and said that her financial resources in such a large area were stretched thin.  She was chair of the Mystery Lake School Division by 2000, and appears to have been elected to the Thompson municipal council in 2002.
Ana Rodriguez holds a teaching degree from the University of Chile.  She was a Mystery Lake School Trustee from 1981 to 1995, a member of the board of governors at Keewatin Community College from 2001 to 2004, and a member of the steering committee for the University College of the North from 2003 to 2004.  In 2004, she was appointed to the twelve-member interim council of University College of the North.  Rodriguez has a particular interest in adult education, multiculturalism and community development.
Morgan Svendsen is a former president of the United Steelworkers of America in Thompson, and was very active in the local labour community.

Footnotes

Municipal elections in Manitoba
1992 elections in Canada
1992 in Manitoba
October 1992 events in Canada